is a city located in Shiga Prefecture, Japan. , the city had an estimated population of 137,266 in 61426 households and a population density of 2000 persons per km². The city is often confused with Kusatsu, Gunma Prefecture, which is a famous hot spring resort.

Geography
Kusatsu is located in southern Shiga Prefecture, on the southeastern shore of Lake Biwa.

Neighboring municipalities
Shiga Prefecture
Ōtsu
Moriyama
Rittō

Climate
Kusatsu has a Humid subtropical climate (Köppen Cfa) characterized by warm summers and cool winters with light to no snowfall.  The average annual temperature in Kusatsu is 14.0 °C. The average annual rainfall is 1430 mm with September as the wettest month. The temperatures are highest on average in August, at around 26.0 °C, and lowest in January, at around 2.5 °C.

Demographics
Per Japanese census data, the population of Kusatsu has increased steadily over the past century.

History

Kusatsu is part of ancient  Ōmi Province. It has been a transportation hub for east-west travel on the ancient Tōsandō and  Tōkaidō highways connecting the capital of Heian-kyō with the provinces of eastern Japan from the end of the Nara period onwards. During the Muromachi period, it developed as a relay point between Kyoto and the Ise Grand Shrines. In 1422, when Shogun Ashikaga Yoshimochi made a pilgrimage to Ise, he built a palace, the "Kusatsu Goshō" in this location. Around 1568, Oda Nobunaga forced Ashikaga Yoshiaki to cede the Kusatsu area, which he viewed as strategically critical to controlling the approaches to Kyoto. Nobunaga made extensive road repairs and reconstructed the Seta Bridge. In the early Edo period, the system of post stations on the Nakasendō and Tōkaidō was formalized by the Tokugawa shogunate in 1602.  Kusatsu-juku developed at the junction of these two highways as a post town from around this time.

The town of Kusatsu was established within Kurita District, Shiga with the creation of the modern municipalities system on April 1, 1889. On October 15, 1954, Kusatsu merged with the neighboring villages of Shizu, Oikami, Yamada, Kasanei and Tokiwa to form the city of Kusatsu.

Government
Kusatsu has a mayor-council form of government with a directly elected mayor and a unicameral city council of 24 members. Kusatsu contributes four members to the Shiga Prefectural Assembly. In terms of national politics, the city is part of Shiga 3rd district of the lower house of the Diet of Japan.

Economy
Kusatsu is a regional commercial center and an important traffic junction of southern Shiga; Biwako Line, Kusatsu Line, Meishin Expressway, Shin-Meishin Expressway, Japan National Route 1 and Japan National Route 8. The city is 30 minutes from Kyoto and 51 minutes from Osaka, and is classified by the Ministry of Land, Infrastructure, Transport and Tourism as part of the greater Kyoto Metropolitan area, thus has increasingly become a commuter town.

Education
Kusatsu has 14 public elementary schools and six public middle schools operated by the city government and four public high schools operated by the Shiga Prefectural Department of Education. The prefecture also operates one special education school for the handicapped. There are also one private middle school and two private high schools. Ritsumeikan University of Kyoto has a subcampus in Kusatsu.

Transportation

Railway
 JR West – Biwako Line
  -  
 JR West – Biwako Line

Highway
  Meishin Expressway
 Shin-Meishin Expressway

International relations

Twin towns – sister cities
Kusatsu is twinned with:
 Pontiac, USA (1978)
 Kan'onji, Japan

Friendship
 Xuhui District, Shanghai, China

Local attractions 

Lake Biwa Museum 
Mizunomori Water Botanical Garden 
Site of Kusatsu-juku, National Historic Site
Ashiura Kannon-ji, National Historic Site

References

External links 

  

Cities in Shiga Prefecture
Kusatsu, Shiga